The State Games of North Carolina (for sponsorship reasons known as the Powerade State Games of North Carolina) is an Olympic-style competition for residents of North Carolina, and a member of the State Games of America.  The goal of the state games is to promote fitness, sportsmanship, and a drug-free environment to North Carolinians.

Many famous athletes have taken part in the games including Roy Lassiter, Julius Peppers, Rashad McCants, Chris Paul, and others.

State Games of NC Sports 

  Archery
  Athletics
  Baseball
  Basketball
  Beach volleyball
  Cycling
 BMX
  Disc golf
  Fencing
  Figure skating
  Golf
  Gymnastics
 Artistic
  Ice hockey
  Karate
  Lacrosse
  Pickleball
  Rugby union
  Shooting
  Skateboarding
  Soccer
  Softball
   Swimming
   Table tennis
   Taekwondo
   Tennis
   Ultimate
  Wrestling

Host cities

Future sites

References

External links
 Powerade State Games of North Carolina
 North Carolina Amateur Sports
 http://toppickleballreviews.com/

Multi-sport events in the United States
Sports in North Carolina